Charles FitzRoy may refer to:

Charles FitzRoy, 2nd Duke of Cleveland (1662–1730), 18th century nobleman
Charles FitzRoy, 2nd Duke of Grafton (1683–1757), nobleman who was Lord Lieutenant of Ireland
Lord Charles FitzRoy (1718–1739), fourth son of Charles FitzRoy, 2nd Duke of Grafton
Charles FitzRoy, 1st Baron Southampton (1737–1797), British statesman and soldier, MP for Bury St. Edmunds
Charles FitzRoy (British Army officer) (1762–1831), son of the above, general
Lord Charles FitzRoy (British Army officer) (1764–1829), second son of Augustus FitzRoy, 3rd Duke of Grafton, general and MP for Bury St. Edmunds
Lord Charles FitzRoy (politician) (1791–1865), second son of George FitzRoy, 4th Duke of Grafton, British Army officer and MP for Bury St. Edmunds
Sir Charles Augustus FitzRoy (1796–1858), governor of Prince Edward Island and New South Wales
Lord Charles Edward FitzRoy (1857–1911), third son of Augustus FitzRoy, 7th Duke of Grafton, reverend
Charles FitzRoy, 10th Duke of Grafton (1892–1970), soldier and farmer
Lord Charles Oliver Edward FitzRoy (1923–1944), second son of Charles FitzRoy, 10th Duke of Grafton, soldier
Lord Charles Patrick Hugh FitzRoy (born 1957), second son of Hugh FitzRoy, 11th Duke of Grafton, author
Charles FitzRoy, 3rd Baron Southampton (1804–1872), British peer